Asura discisigna is a moth of the  family Erebidae. It is found in India and on Borneo.

References

discisigna
Moths described in 1878
Moths of Asia